This is a list of notable beef dishes and foods, whereby beef is used as a primary ingredient. Beef is the culinary name for meat from bovines, especially cattle. Beef can be harvested from cows, bulls, heifers or steers. Acceptability as a food source varies in different parts of the world.

Beef is the third most widely consumed meat in the world, accounting for about 25% of meat production worldwide, after pork and poultry at 38% and 30% respectively. In absolute numbers, the United States, Brazil, and the People's Republic of China are the world's three largest consumers of beef. On a per capita basis in 2009, Argentines consumed the most beef at 64.6 kg per person; people in the U.S. ate 40.2 kg, while those in the E.U. ate 16.9 kg.

Beef dishes

Raw beef dishes

Steak dishes

Veal dishes

Veal is the meat of  young cattle (calves), in contrast to the beef from older cattle. Though veal can be produced from a calf of either sex and any breed, most veal comes from male calves (bull calves) of dairy cattle breeds. Generally, veal is more expensive than beef from older cattle.

See also

 Beefsteak
 Cut of beef
 List of chicken dishes
 List of fish dishes
 List of hamburgers
 List of lamb dishes
 List of meatball dishes
 List of pork dishes
 List of seafood dishes
 List of steak dishes
 List of veal dishes
 Steakhouse

References

 
Beef dishes